Revenue-cap regulation allows the operator to change its prices within baskets of services so long as the change in revenue does not exceed the revenue cap index. This index typically reflects the overall rate of inflation in the economy, the inflation in the operator's input prices relative to the average firm in the economy and the ability of the operator to gain efficiencies relative to the average firm in the economy. Price-cap regulation attempts to do the same thing but for prices, rather than revenue.

The system is intended to provide incentives for efficiency savings, as any savings above the productivity factor (this predicted rate of efficiency is commonly called the X-factor) can be passed on to shareholders, at least until the revenue caps are next reviewed (usually every five years). A key part of the system is that the X-factor is based not only a firm's past performance, but on the performance of other firms in the industry: X is intended to be a proxy for a competitive market, in industries which are natural monopolies.

Now consider how a utility operator might be different from the average firm in the economy. First, assume that the operator is just like the average firm, except that the operator's input prices change at a rate that is different from the rate of change for the average firm. If the operator's input prices increase faster than (conversely, slower than) the rate of inflation, then the operator's revenue will need to increase faster than (conversely, slower than) the rate of inflation for the operator to be able to have earnings that are at least as great as the operator's cost of capital. Now assume that the operator is just like the average firm, except with respect to the operator's ability to improve efficiency. If the operator increases its productivity faster than (conversely, slower than) the average firm, then the operator's revenue will need to decrease (conversely, increase) relative to the rate of inflation.

Combining these two possible differences between the operator and the average firm in the economy, the operator's revenue should change at the rate of inflation, minus (conversely, plus) the extent to which its input prices inflate less than (conversely, greater than) the rate of inflation, and minus (conversely, plus) the extent to which the operator's productivity is expected to improve at a rate that is greater than (conversely, less than) the average firm in the economy.

The above analysis identifies two things. First, the inflation rate, I, used in the revenue cap index represents the general rate of inflation for the economy. Second, the X-factor is intended to capture the difference between the operator and the average firm in the economy with respect to inflation in input prices and changes in productivity. That is to say, the choice of inflation index and of the X-factor go hand in hand. Some regulators choose a general measure of inflation, such as a gross national product price index. In this case, the X-factor reflects the difference between the operator and the average firm in the economy with respect to the operator's ability to improve its productivity and the effect of inflation on the operator's input costs. Other regulators choose a retail (or producer) price index. In these cases, the X-factor represents the difference between the operator and the average retail (or wholesale) firm. Lastly, some regulators construct price indices of operator inputs. In these cases, the X-factor reflects productivity changes of the operator.

Revenue cap regulation is more appropriate than price cap regulation when costs do not vary appreciably with units of sales.

References

Monopoly (economics)
Economics of regulation